Pike County is a county located in the west central portion of the U.S. state of Georgia. As of the 2020 census, the population was 18,889. The county seat is Zebulon.

History 
Pike County was made from part of Monroe County in 1822.  It was named after Zebulon Montgomery Pike, an explorer and army officer.

Geography
The entirety of Pike County is located in the Upper Flint River sub-basin of the ACF River Basin (Apalachicola-Chattahoochee-Flint River Basin). The county is located in the Piedmont region of the state.

Major highways

  U.S. Route 19
  U.S. Route 41
  State Route 3
  State Route 7
  State Route 18
  State Route 74
  State Route 109
  State Route 362

Adjacent counties
 Spalding County (north)
 Lamar County (east)
 Upson County (south)
 Meriwether County (west)

Demographics

2000 census
As of the census of 2000, there were 13,688 people, 4,755 households, and 3,784 families living in the county. There were 5,068 housing units at an average density of 23 per square mile (9/km2). The racial makeup of the county was 83.64% White, 14.79% Black or African American, 0.21% Native American, 0.37% Asian, 0.42% from other races, and 0.57% from two or more races.  1.22% of the population were Hispanic or Latino of any race.

There were 4,755 households, out of which 37.00% had children under the age of 18 living with them, 65.40% were married couples living together, 10.50% had a female householder with no husband present, and 20.40% were non-families. 17.50% of all households were made up of individuals, and 7.50% had someone living alone who was 65 years of age or older.  The average household size was 2.81 and the average family size was 3.18.

In the county, the population was spread out, with 27.60% under the age of 18, 8.00% from 18 to 24, 30.20% from 25 to 44, 23.30% from 45 to 64, and 10.90% who were 65 years of age or older.  The median age was 36 years. For every 100 females, there were 100.20 males.  For every 100 females age 18 and over, there were 97.70 males.

The median income for a household in the county was $44,370, and the median income for a family was $49,798. Males had a median income of $33,114 versus $23,800 for females. The per capita income for the county was $17,661.  About 6.90% of families and 9.60% of the population were below the poverty line, including 11.60% of those under age 18 and 11.00% of those age 65 or over.

2010 census
As of the 2010 United States Census, there were 17,869 people, 6,187 households, and 4,906 families living in the county. The racial makeup of the county was 87.3% white, 10.3% black or African American, 0.3% Asian, 0.3% American Indian, 0.4% from other races, and 1.3% from two or more races. Those of Hispanic or Latino origin made up 1.1% of the population. In terms of ancestry, 21.4% were American, 17.6% were English, 17.1% were Irish, and 13.2% were German.

Of the 6,187 households, 41.6% had children under the age of 18 living with them, 63.3% were married couples living together, 11.0% had a female householder with no husband present, 20.7% were non-families, and 17.6% of all households were made up of individuals. The average household size was 2.84 and the average family size was 3.20. The median age was 38.5 years.

The median income for a household in the county was $53,213 and the median income for a family was $57,458. Males had a median income of $43,958 versus $28,148 for females. The per capita income for the county was $21,051. About 9.4% of families and 10.5% of the population were below the poverty line, including 14.7% of those under age 18 and 7.1% of those age 65 or over.

2020 census

As of the 2020 United States census, there were 18,889 people, 6,143 households, and 4,525 families residing in the county.

Education
Georgia Military College has an extension campus near Zebulon City Hall.

The Pike County School District serves Pike County. The school district has one Pre-K building (lottery funded), one primary school (K-2), one elementary school (3-5), one middle school (6-8), a ninth grade academy and one high school (10-12). Michael Duncan, Ed. D is the Superintendent of Schools.

Communities

Cities
 Meansville
 Molena
 Zebulon (county seat)

Town
 Concord
 Williamson

Census-designated place
 Hilltop

Unincorporated communities
 Jolly
 Lifsey

Politics

See also

 National Register of Historic Places listings in Pike County, Georgia
List of counties in Georgia

References

 
Georgia (U.S. state) counties
Pike
1822 establishments in Georgia (U.S. state)
Populated places established in 1822